Grafton (Bundjalung-Yugambeh: Gumbin Gir) is a city in the Northern Rivers region of the Australian state of New South Wales. The closest major cities, Brisbane and the Gold Coast, are located across the border in South-East Queensland. At the 2021 census, Grafton had a population of 19,255. The city is the largest settlement and, with Maclean, the shared administrative centre of the Clarence Valley Council local government area, which is home to over 50,000 people in all.

History
Before European settlement, the Clarence River marked the border between the  Bundjalung and Gumbaynggirr peoples, and so descendants of the speakers of both language-groups can now be found in the Grafton region.

Grafton, like many other settlements in the area, was first opened up to European settlement by the  cedar-getters. An escaped convict, Richard Craig, explored the district in 1831. With the wealth of "red gold" cedar just waiting for exploitation, he was given a pardon and one hundred pounds to bring a party of cedar-getters on the cutter Prince George to the region. Word of such wealth to be had did not take long to spread. One of the arrivals on the Susan in 1838, pioneer John Small, first occupied land on Woodford Island. 'The Settlement' (as the embryonic Grafton was then imaginatively named) was established shortly after.In 1851  Governor  FitzRoy officially named the town "Grafton", after his grandfather, the Duke of Grafton, who had served as Prime Minister of the United Kingdom from 1768 to 1770. Grafton was proclaimed a city in 1885. Local industries include logging, beef cattle, fishing/prawning, sugar, manufacturing and tourism.

The  Grafton Bridge, connecting the main townsite with  South Grafton, opened in 1932. It completed the standard-gauge rail connection between Sydney and Brisbane, also forming a vital link for the Pacific Highway. Previously the only way to travel from Grafton to South Grafton was via ferry. As a result, South Grafton developed quite a separate identity, and in fact had its own municipal government from 1896 to 1956.

The introduction of fluoride to the town water supply in 1964 was accompanied by protest which became physical. The fluoride plant was blown up the night before commencement, the dentist supporting fluoridation received bomb threats against his family and later pro- and anti-fluoridation float participants at the annual Jacaranda Festival came to blows and a gun was produced.

Heritage listings 
Grafton has a number of heritage-listed sites, including:
 Duke Street: Christ Church Cathedral
 170 Hoof Street: Grafton Correctional Centre
 North Coast railway: Grafton Bridge
 95 Prince Street: Saraton Theatre
 150 Victoria Street: Arcola, Grafton

Demographics 

At the 2021 census, Grafton had a population of 19,255.

According to the Census:
 Aboriginal and Torres Strait Islander people made up 10.4% of Grafton's population.
 87.1% of people were born in Australia. The next most common countries of birth were England 1.4% and New Zealand 0.7%.
 90.5% of people spoke only English at home.
 The most common responses for religion were No Religion 37.8%, Anglican 20.9%, and Catholic 18.2%.

Climate
Grafton has a humid subtropical climate (Köppen: Cfa, Trewartha: Cfal) with significantly more rainfall in summer than in winter. Rainfall is lower than in stations directly on the coast, but monthly rain totals can often surpass . Grafton gets around 115.2 clear days on an annual basis. Grafton like many NSW regional centres, is affected by heatwaves in the summer months. On 12 February 2017 Grafton recorded a maximum temperature of 46.3 ºC (115.3 ºF), the city's highest recorded temperature since records began in 1966.

Culture

Grafton is known and promoted as the Jacaranda City, in reference to its tree-lined streets and to the annual Jacaranda Festival. Inaugurated in 1935, Jacaranda is held each October/November. A half-day public holiday is observed locally on the first Thursday of November, the Festival's major focal day. During the 1963 festival, inventor John W. Dickenson demonstrated on the Clarence River the first hang glider that was controlled by weight shifts of the pilot from a swinging control frame – the birth of modern hang gliding.

A half-day public holiday is also observed for the Grafton Cup horse race, held each year on the second Thursday in July. It is the high point of the city's annual Racing Carnival—Australia's largest and richest non-metropolitan Carnival—which takes place over a fortnight in that month.

Grafton is the birthplace of several renowned country music players. Local artist Troy Cassar-Daley received four Golden Guitar awards at the 2006 Tamworth Country Music Awards—the largest and most prestigious country music awards in Australia. At the same event Samantha McClymont, the 2005/2006 Grafton Jacaranda Queen and sister of Brooke McClymont, also received an award for her country music talent.

A vision of Grafton with its numerous brilliantly-flowered trees in bloom is immortalised in Australian popular music in Cold Chisel's song Flame Trees, written by band member Don Walker, who had lived in Grafton during his formative years.

Sports
The most popular sport in Grafton is Rugby league. There are two clubs from Grafton in the Group 2 Rugby League competition; the Grafton Ghosts and their arch-rival South Grafton Rebels. The two clubs each have a rich history, and derbies between the clubs have been known to draw attendances in excess of 3000 people.

Rugby League Clubs in Grafton:
 Grafton Ghosts
 South Grafton Rebels

Other sports such as soccer, Rugby union, Australian rules and Field Hockey are also played in Grafton.

Notable buildings

Christ Church Cathedral, designed by John Horbury Hunt, was consecrated in 1884 and is the seat of the Anglican Diocese of Grafton.

Schaeffer House is a historic 1900 Federation house and contains the collection of the Clarence River Historical Society, which was formed in 1931.

Transportation

The Murwillumbah – Byron Bay – Lismore railway (opened in 1894) was extended to Grafton's original railway station in 1905; for details, see Murwillumbah railway line. The North Coast Line reached South Grafton's railway station from Sydney in 1915. Pending the opening of the combined road and rail bascule bridge in 1932, Grafton had a train ferry to connect the two railways. Clarence Valley Regional Airport is the airport that services Grafton.

Grafton also lies on the Pacific Highway, the main North–South road route through Eastern Australia, and links it to the Gwydir Highway, one of the primary east–west routes through Eastern Australia.

Busways Grafton is the operator for local routes, as well as out-of-town routes to Junction Hill, Jackadgery/Cangai, Copmanhurst, and Maclean and Yamba.

Lawrence Bus Service operates a shopper service, as well as school service on school days, to and from Lawrence.

Northern Rivers Buslines operates a weekday service to Lismore via Maclean, Evans Head and Coraki.

NSW TrainLink provides a coach service to Byron Bay, connecting off the train from Sydney. It also offers a coach service to Moree via Glen Innes, connecting from the train from Brisbane.

Industry
From 1904 to 1917 the Grafton Copper Mining Company Ltd operated a copper mine, smelter and tramway at Cangai, more than 100 km from Grafton via the Clarence and Mann rivers, today about 70 km over the Gwydir Highway. From 1952 to 1997, first as an independent company, then owned by Tooheys since 1961, the Grafton brewery provided Grafton Bitter to the North Coast. The nearby Harwood Mill is the oldest working sugar mill in New South Wales.

Newspapers
The daily newspaper of Grafton is The Daily Examiner, owned by Australian Provincial Newspapers (APN).

Radio and television

Radio stations
2GF 1206 AM/103.9 FM (commercial)
FM 104.7 (commercial)
Triple J 91.5 FM/96.1 FM
ABC Northern Rivers 738 AM/94.5 FM
ABC Classic FM 97.9 FM/95.3 FM
Radio National 99.5 FM/96.9 FM
2KY Racing Radio 101.5 FM
Life FM 103.1 (community)
Raw FM 87.6

Television channels
 Seven (Formerly Prime7), 7HD, 7two, 7mate, 7Bravo, 7flix, ishop tv, Racing.com, owned and operated by the Seven Network.
 Nine (NBN Television); 9HD, 9Gem, 9Gem HD, 9Go!, 9Life, Extra, owned and operated by the Nine Network.
 10, 10HD, 10 Bold, 10 Peach – (10 Northern NSW, owned by WIN Corporation), (Network 10 affiliated channels).
 ABC Television including ABC, ABC TV Plus, ABC Me and ABC News, part of the Australian Broadcasting Corporation
 Special Broadcasting Service, SBS, SBS Viceland, SBS Food, SBS World Movies, SBS WorldWatch and NITV
Pay television services are provided by Foxtel.

Of the three main networks, NBN produces an evening news bulletin containing regional, national and international news, screening every night at 6:00pm on Channel 9. Seven News produces a mid north coast news bulletin screening weeknights at 6:00pm. WIN Television’s WIN News produces news updates throughout the day, broadcast from the Wollongong studios.

Education

Public schools 
 Copmanhurst Public School
 Gillwinga Public School
 Grafton High School
 Grafton Public School
 South Grafton High School
 South Grafton Public School
 Westlawn Public School

Independent schools
 Clarence Valley Anglican School (formerly The Cathedral School)
 McAuley Catholic College
 St. Joseph's Primary School
 St. Mary's Primary School
 St. Andrew's Christian School

Defunct public schools
A large number of small (mostly one-teacher) public schools existed in the Grafton and Clarence Valley areas in the past. These schools have included:
 Alumny Creek 1872–1969
 Angowrie 1895–1899
 Billys Creek 1946–1963
 Calliope 1890–1983
 Carr's Creek 1877–1964
 Clouds Creek 1943–1964
 Coalcroft 1875–1971 (originally known as Coaldale till 1912)
 Coldstream Lower 1873–1966
 Eatonsville 1881–1961
 Glenferneigh 1928–1967
 Kungala 1926–1977
 Lawrence Lower 1883–1955
 Mororo 1886–1939
 Palmers Channel 1869–1975 (originally known as Taloumbi till 1907)
 Seelands 1889–1967
 Shark Creek 1877–1927
 Smalls Forest 1885–1971
 South Arm 1871–1967
 Southgate 1867–1875
 Stockyard Creek 1882–1895
 Swan Creek 1870–1994
 Trenayr 1901–1970 (originally known as Milers Waterholes till 1912)
 Tullymorgan 1886–1971 (originally known as Cormicks Creek till 1911)
 Tyndale 1868–1975
 Ulgundah Island Aboriginal 1908–1951 (near Maclean)
 Woodford Leigh 1869–1956
 Woombah 1872–1953

Military history
During World War II, Grafton was the location of RAAF No.6 Inland Aircraft Fuel Depot (IAFD), completed in 1942 and closed on 29 August 1944. Usually consisting of 4 tanks, 31 fuel depots were built across Australia for the storage and supply of aircraft fuel for the Royal Australian Air Force and the US Army Air Forces at a total cost of £900,000 ($1,800,000).

Notable people
Notable people who were born or lived in Grafton include:

 James Armah (moved to Grafton in 2016) professional dual Commonwealth champion boxer
 Troy Cassar-Daley, country musician
 Fanny Cohen (born 1887), headmistress
 Matthew Colless (born 1960) astronomer and Director of the Research School of Astronomy and Astrophysics (RSAA) at the Australian National University (ANU). He was for nine years previously the Director of the Australian Astronomical Observatory (AAO), Australia's national optical observatory.
 Peter Drysdale (born 1938), economist
 Adam Eckersley, musician
 Havelock Ellis (1859–1939), pioneer sexologist, held the position of assistant master at a local private grammar school during 1877.
 Nick Emmett, rugby league player
 Jim Eggins (1898–1952), politician
 Gary Foley (born 1950), Aboriginal activist, academic, writer
 Charles Hercules Green (1919–1950), officer
 George Green (1883–unknown), rugby league player
 Henry Kendall (18 April 1839 – 1 August 1882)
 Andrew Landenberger (born 1966), Olympic sailor and medalist
 Robyn Lambley (born 1965), politician
 Carly Leeson (born 1998), cricketer
 Jimmy Lisle (1939–2003), rugby league and rugby union player
 Brent Livermore (born 5 July 1976), field hockey midfielder
 Ryan Maskelyne (born 1999), Olympic swimmer, competing for Papua New Guinea
 The McClymonts, country music group consisting of sisters Brooke, Samantha and Mollie
 Frank McGuren (1909–1990), politician
 Iven Giffard Mackay (7 April 1882 – 30 September 1966), Lieutenant General
 David Marchant AM (born 1954), railway industry executive
 Bill McLennan (born 1942), statistician
 Chris Masters (born 1948), journalist
 Gillian Mears (born 1964), author
 James Lionel Michael, poet and solicitor (moved to Grafton 1861, died in Grafton 1868)
 Tony Mundine (born 1951), boxer
 Warren Mundine (born 1956), politician
 Kevin Nichols (born 1955), track cyclist
 Sir Earle Page (8 August 1880 – 20 December 1961), 11th Prime Minister of Australia, 1939
 Geoff Page (born 1940) poet
 Ruby Payne-Scott (1912–1981), pioneer in radiophysics and radio astronomy
 Frank Partridge (1924–1964), recipient of the Victoria Cross
 Cameron Pilley (born 1982), squash player
 Eddie Purkiss (born 1934), rugby union player
 Tyrone Roberts (born 1 June 1991), Newcastle Knights and Gold Coast Titans footballer
 Michael Rush (1844–1921), rower
 Lindsay Gordon Scott (1898–1941), architect
 Henry Ernest Searle (1866–1889), rower
 Sir Grafton Elliot Smith (15 August 1871 – 1 January 1937), anatomist and palaeoanthropologist
 Tse Tsan-tai (1872–1938), Chinese revolutionary
 James Tully (1877–1962), politician
 William Edward Vincent (1823–1861), founded The Clarence and Richmond Examiner
 Brenda Walker (born 1957), writer
 Don Walker (born 1951), musician
 Arthur Bache Walkom (1889–1976), palaeobotanist and museum director
 Bill Weiley (1901–1989), politician
 Danny Wicks (born 1985), rugby league player
 Graham Wilson, rugby league footballer of the 1960s
 Walter George Woolnough (1876–1958), geologist
 Beau Young (born 1974), singer-songwriter, surfer

References

External links

Clarence Valley Council Website
Clarence Valley Tourism Website
Grafton, tropicalnsw.com.au
Photographs of Grafton in 1994, National Library of Australia
Jacaranda Festival Grafton 
 Gillwinga Public School
 Grafton High School
 Grafton Public School
 South Grafton High School 
 South Grafton Public School
 Westlawn Public School
 Clarence Valley Anglican School
 St Josephs Primary School
 St Mary's Primary School
 St. Andrew's Christian School

 
1851 establishments in Australia
Northern Rivers
Clarence Valley Council